The 1985 NCAA Division I women's volleyball tournament began with 28 teams and ended on December 22, 1985, when Pacific defeated Stanford 3 games to 1 in the NCAA championship match.

Pacific, making their 4th NCAA final four in five years (in addition to their 1980 AIAW title match loss), claimed the school's first NCAA title for women's volleyball. Stanford finished as NCAA runners-up for the second year in a row. After losing a thrilling game 1 by two points, Pacific rallied to win the next three to take the title with the scores of 15-7, 15-12, 15-13.

Future Olympian sisters Elaina Oden and Kim Oden played against each other in the final. Elaina Oden, a freshman hitter for the Pacific Tigers, had 24 kills against Stanford.

In the consolation match, Southern California defeated UCLA in five games to claim third place.

Brackets

West regional

Mideast regional

South regional

Northwest regional

Final Four - Read Fieldhouse, Kalamazoo, Michigan

See also
NCAA Women's Volleyball Championship

References

NCAA Women's Volleyball Championship
NCAA Division I Women's
NCAA Division I women's volleyball tournament
NCAA Division I women's volleyball tournament
Volleyball in Michigan
Sports competitions in Michigan
Women's sports in Michigan